The ACC women's soccer tournament is the conference championship tournament in soccer for the Atlantic Coast Conference (ACC).  The tournament has been held every year since 1988.  It is a single-elimination tournament and seeding is based on regular season records. The winner, declared conference champion, receives the conference's automatic bid to the NCAA Division I women's soccer championship.  Historically, there have been eight teams to qualify for the tournament.  However between 2014 and 2016, the tournament was reduced to 4 teams from the usual 8 teams.  The tournament was reduced to six teams in 2021

Champions

Key

By year

Source:

By school

Pre-tournament champions
Prior to 1988, the champion was determined based on regular season play.

References

 
NCAA Division I women's soccer conference tournaments